Scott Munroe (born January 20, 1982) is a Canadian former professional ice hockey goaltender who predominantly played in the American Hockey League (AHL). He is currently serving as an assistant coach with Trinity College.

Playing career
Munroe played NCAA Division I hockey at the University of Alabama in Huntsville from 2002 to 2006. Playing in 99 games for the Chargers, Munroe is the all-time career save percentage leader (.918) for UAH. Munroe also holds UAH season records for games played (31), most minutes (1812:54), most shots faced (1,084), most saves (993). He also holds the Chargers' single period record for saves and shots faced stopping 33 of 34 shots against the University of Minnesota on Nov. 2, 2003.

Munroe earned College Hockey America co-Player of the Year honors following his senior year. He also earned CHA Rookie of the Year honors for his play as a freshman. Munroe signed with the Philadelphia Flyers on April 16, 2006.

On April 24, 2008, Munroe was the winning goaltender in the longest AHL game ever played. It was Game 5 of the East Division Semifinals where the Philadelphia Phantoms faced the Albany River Rats at Times Union Center in Albany. The game lasted 142:58 and ended in the fifth overtime where the Phantoms won 3–2. Munroe had 65 stops in the victory while the losing goaltender, Michael Leighton, had 98 saves.

On July 1, 2009, he signed a one-year deal with the New York Islanders.

In the summer of 2011 he signed a one-year two-way deal with the Pittsburgh Penguins. The following off-season on August 23, 2012, he signed a one-year AHL deal with the Adirondack Phantoms.

On June 17, 2013, Munroe signed a one-year contract with the Växjö Lakers of the Swedish Hockey League (SHL). On April 16, 2014, Växjö announced that they will not renew Munroe's contract.

After a year in the SHL, Munroe signed for his final professional season to an AHL/ECHL two-way contract with the Springfield Falcons in the 2014–15 campaign.

Post-retirement
On June 30, 2015, Munroe announced his retirement from professional hockey in serving as an assistant coach and goaltending co-ordinator with major junior team, the Moncton Wildcats of the Quebec Major Junior Hockey League.

After two seasons with the Wildcats, Munroe left the team and continued his coaching career in accepting an assistant role with NCAA Division III participant, Trinity College of Connecticut for the 2017–18 season.

Career statistics

Awards and honours

References

External links

1982 births
Living people
Adirondack Phantoms players
Alabama–Huntsville Chargers men's ice hockey players
Bridgeport Sound Tigers players
Canadian ice hockey goaltenders
Kalamazoo Wings (ECHL) players
HC Neftekhimik Nizhnekamsk players
Sportspeople from Moose Jaw
Springfield Falcons players
Philadelphia Phantoms players
Wilkes-Barre/Scranton Penguins players
Växjö Lakers players
Canadian expatriate ice hockey players in Russia
Canadian expatriate ice hockey players in Sweden